Arrolobos is a village and alqueria located in the municipality of Caminomorisco, in Cáceres province, Extremadura, Spain. As of 2020, it has a population of 128.

Geography 
Arrolobos is located 171km north-northeast of Cáceres, Spain.

References

Populated places in the Province of Cáceres